Gomberg's dimer is the organic compound with the formula Ph2C=C6H5-CPh3, where Ph = C6H5. It is a yellow solid that is air-stable for hours at room temperature and soluble in organic solvents. The compound achieved fame as the dimer of triphenylmethyl radical, which was prepared by Moses Gomberg in his quest for hexaphenylethane. 

Its quinoid structure has been determined by X-ray crystallography. The C-C bond that reversibly breaks is rather long at 159.7 picometers.

Synthesis and reactions
Gomberg's dimer can be prepared quantitatively by treating trityl bromide with powdered copper or silver:
2Ph3CBr  +  2Cu  →   Ph2C=C6H5-CPh3  +  2CuBr
Gomberg's dimer reversibly dissociates to the triphenylmethyl radical in organic solvents:

See also 
 Hexaphenylethane

References

Aromatic hydrocarbons